Cégep de la Pocatière is a Cégep in La Pocatière, Quebec, Canada.

Campus
The CEGEP has a campus at La Pocatière and the campus of Centre d'études collégiales de Montmagny.

Partnership
The College of General and Vocational Education is affiliated with the ACCC, and CCAA.

History
In 1967, several institutions were merged and became public ones, when the Quebec system of CEGEPs was created.

Programs

The CEGEP offers two types of programs: four pre-university and eight technical. The pre-university programs, which take two years to complete, cover the subject matters which roughly correspond to the additional year of high school given elsewhere in Canada in preparation for a chosen field in university. The technical programs, which take three-years to complete, applies to students who wish to pursue a skill trade. In addition Continuing education and services to business are provided.

See also
 List of colleges in Quebec
 Higher education in Quebec

References

External links

 Cégep de la Pocatière Website in French

La Pocatiere
Educational institutions established in 1967
Education in Bas-Saint-Laurent
Buildings and structures in Bas-Saint-Laurent
1967 establishments in Quebec
La Pocatière